Louise Knak Lyksborg (born 17 January 1988) is a former Danish handball, who last played for Silkeborg-Voel KFUM and the Danish  national team.

References

1988 births
Danish female handball players
People from Hillerød Municipality
Living people
Sportspeople from the Capital Region of Denmark